In biochemistry, an Eadie–Hofstee diagram (more usually called an Eadie–Hofstee plot) is a graphical representation of the Michaelis–Menten equation in enzyme kinetics. It has been known by various different names, including Eadie plot, Hofstee plot and Augustinsson plot. Attribution to Woolf is often omitted, because although Haldane and Stern credited Woolf with the underlying equation, it was just one of the three linear transformations of the Michaelis–Menten equation that they initially introduced. However, Haldane indicated latter that Woolf had indeed found the three linear forms: "In 1932, Dr. Kurt Stern published a German translation of my book "Enzymes", with numerous additions to the English text. On pp. 119-120, I described some graphical methods, stating that they were due to my friend Dr. Barnett Woolf. [...] Woolf pointed out that linear graphs are obtained when  is plotted against ,  against , or  against , the first plot being most convenient unless inhibition is being studied."

Derivation of the equation for the plot

The simplest equation for the rate  of an enzyme-catalysed reaction as a function of the substrate concentration  is the Michaelis-Menten equation, which can be written as follows:

Eadie and Hofstee independently transformed this into straight-line relationships, as follows: Taking reciprocals of both sides of the equation gives the equation underlying the Lineweaver–Burk plot: 

 · 

This can be rearranged to express a different straight-line relationship:

 · 

which shows that a plot of  against  is a straight line with intercept  on the ordinate, and slope  (Hofstee plot). In the Eadie plot the axes are reversed, but the principle is the same. These plots are kinetic versions of the Scatchard plot used in ligand-binding experiments.

Attribution to Augustinsson

The plot is occasionally attributed to Augustinsson and referred to the Woolf–Augustinsson–Hofstee plot or simply the Augustinsson plot. However, although Haldane, Woolf or Eadie are not explicitly cited when Augustinsson introduces the  versus  equation, both the work of Haldane and of Eadie are cited at other places of his work and are listed in his bibliography.

Effect of experimental error
Experimental error is usually assumed to affect the rate  and not the substrate concentration , so  is the dependent variable. As a result, both ordinate  and abscissa  are subject to experimental error, and so the deviations that occur due to error are not parallel with the ordinate axis but towards or away from the origin. As long as the plot is used for illustrating an analysis rather than for estimating the parameters, that matters very little. Regardless of these considerations various authors have compared the suitability of the various plots for displaying and analysing data.

Use for estimating parameters

Making faults in experimental design visible
As the ordinate scale spans the entire range of theoretically possible  vales, from 0 to  one can see at a glance at an Eadie–Hofstee plot how well the experimental design fills the theoretical design space, and the plot makes it impossible to hide poor design. By contrast, the other well known straight-line plots make it easy to choose scales that imply that the design is better than it is.

See also 
 Michaelis–Menten equation
 Lineweaver–Burk plot
 Hanes–Woolf plot

Footnotes and references 

Diagrams
Enzyme kinetics
 
Biotechnology
Molecular biology